The selenide iodides are chemical compounds that contain both selenide ions (Se2−) and iodide ions (I−) and one or metal atoms. They are in the class of mixed anion compounds or chalcogenide halides.

Some related compounds do not actually contain a selenide ion, instead containing an iodoselenium cation. These cations include SeI3+, Se2I42+, Se6I22+, and polymeric Se6I+.

List

References

Selenides
Iodides